Manavgatspor is a football club located in Antalya, Turkey. The team competes in the Turkish Regional Amateur League.

Previous names 
 Manavgat Evrensekispor (2009–2014)
 Manavgatspor (2014–2019)

Stadium 
Currently the team plays at Evrenseki Stadı.

Current squad

References

External links 
Manavgatspor on TFF.org

TFF Third League clubs
Football clubs in Turkey